Raimondo Borsellino (27 April 1905 – 26 December 1998) was an Italian politician. He was born in Cattolica Eraclea, and represented the Christian Democracy in the Constituent Assembly of Italy from 1946 to 1948 and in the Chamber of Deputies from 1948 to 1958.

References

1905 births
1998 deaths
People from Cattolica Eraclea
Christian Democracy (Italy) politicians
Members of the Constituent Assembly of Italy
Deputies of Legislature I of Italy
Deputies of Legislature II of Italy
Politicians from the Province of Agrigento